John's Grill is a historic restaurant located in San Francisco, California at 63 Ellis Street. The restaurant is famous, in part, thanks to the novel The Maltese Falcon.  On the climactic final night of the novel's plot, detective Sam Spade dines on chops, potatoes, and tomato at John's Grill after coming into possession of the titular falcon.

History
John's Grill was established in 1908 and was the first restaurant to open in Downtown San Francisco after the 1906 San Francisco Earthquake

With Dashiell Hammett's The Maltese Falcon as its backdrop, the restaurant serves American cuisine. Specialties include fresh oysters, Maine lobster ravioli, and feta cheese for appetizers; seafood for salads with special herbs and dressings, steak and lamb chops, seafood, and shellfish. 
The restaurant stands at the edge of the Tenderloin neighborhood, more or less where it becomes the tourist-oriented "Powell Street Turnaround" section of San Francisco.

The grill boasts a variety of famous patrons on their website.

References

External links
 John's Grill official website

Restaurants in San Francisco
Restaurants established in 1908
1908 establishments in California